Blackwater Natural Bridge is a natural arch in Shoshone National Forest, Wyoming. Blackwater Natural Bridge is to the east of the headwaters of Blackwater Creek, which flows north to the North Fork Shoshone River. No official determination of the height or span of the arch has been completed and the estimated size of the arch varies greatly.

Blackwater Natural Bridge is in a remote region that is off trail but can be viewed after a  round-trip hike depending on starting point from the Blackwater Natural Bridge trailhead located off of U.S. Routes 14/16/20. The trailhead is a  drive from Cody, Wyoming. The trail also leads past the site of the Blackwater fire of 1937 where 15 firefighters were killed and another 38 injured, and is the worst loss of life of firefighters in the history of Wyoming and one of the worst in U.S. history.

References

Shoshone National Forest
Landforms of Park County, Wyoming
Natural arches of Wyoming